Little Honey is the ninth studio album by American singer-songwriter Lucinda Williams, released on October 14, 2008, by Lost Highway Records. The album debuted at No. 9 on the Billboard 200, selling 35,000 copies that week, thereby becoming her first Top 10 album.

A critical and commercial success, the album earned Williams a nomination for the Grammy Award for Best Americana Album in 2010, the first year to feature this category.

Music and lyrics
The album includes guest appearances by Elvis Costello, Susanna Hoffs, Matthew Sweet and Charlie Louvin. "Circles and X's" was written in 1985, around the same time was "If Wishes Were Horses," while "Well Well Well" dates from 1991. "Real Love" was released to radio and digital outlets as the first single.

Critical reception

Little Honey was met with widespread critical acclaim. At Metacritic, which assigns a weighted average rating out of 100 to reviews from mainstream publications, the album received an average score of 72, based on 23 reviews. Spin called it "her finest record since Car Wheels on a Gravel Road," stating she "goes back to the roots-rock well and takes a long, satisfying swig". Rolling Stone rated the 4 out of a possible 5 stars, singling out the track "If Wishes Were Horses" as "sublime". AllMusic called the album "the most polished and studied record she's ever made", stating "its sound is utterly contemporary, though its forms are rooted in electric '70s rock as well as her fallbacks on blues and old-school Americana", but concluded that there are "songs that pack some punch, but no jaw-dropping wallops".

Awards

Track listing
All songs by Lucinda Williams, except where indicated.

 "Real Love" – 3:45
 "Circles and X's" – 3:40
 "Tears of Joy" – 4:27
 "Little Rock Star" – 5:42
 "Honey Bee" – 3:05
 "Well Well Well" – 4:29
 "If Wishes Were Horses" – 5:40
 "Jailhouse Tears" – 5:28
 "Knowing" – 6:00
 "Heaven Blues" – 5:23
 "Rarity" – 8:43
 "Plan to Marry" – 3:26
 "It's a Long Way to the Top" (Angus Young, Malcolm Young, Bon Scott) – 4:56  (Originally performed by AC/DC)

Bonus tracks
"Jailhouse Tears" (Demo) – 4:49 (Best Buy download/UK CD bonus track)
"Rarity" (Demo) – 7:35 (Best Buy download)
"Knowing" (Demo) – 4:42 (Best Buy download)
"Circles & X's" (Demo) – 3:58 (Best Buy download)
"If Wishes Were Horses" (Demo) – 4:55 (Best Buy download)
"Real Love" (Alternate Early Version) – 3:39 (iTunes United States)

"Lu in '08" EP
Released on October 28, 2008, as a Digital-Only EP featuring 4 live tracks (3 covers and one original):

 "Masters of War"  
 "For What It's Worth"  
 "Marching the Hate Machines Into the Sun"  
 "Bone of Contention"  

Notes
  "Bone of Contention" has been incorrectly regarded as an "AmazonMP3" exclusive bonus track.  The live version (from the "Lu in '08" ep) was given away free to those who pre-ordered "Little Honey" from Amazon.com.

Personnel
Lucinda Williams – vocals, acoustic guitar
Butch Norton – drums, percussion
David Sutton – electric bass, double bass, cello
Chet Lyster – electric and acoustic guitars, saw and table steel
Doug Pettibone – electric and acoustic guitars, pedal steel

Additional musicians

Rob Burger – wurlitzer, vibraphone, piano, Hammond organ
Matthew Sweet, Susanna Hoffs – backing vocals ("Real Love", "Little Rock Star", "Rarity")
Charlie Louvin, Jim Lauderdale – backing vocals ("Well Well Well")
Elvis Costello – vocals ("Jailhouse Tears")
Susan Marshall, Gia Ciambotti, Kristen Mooney  – backing vocals ("Tears of Joy")
Kristen Mooney, Tim Easton, Susan Marshall – backing vocals ("It's a Long Way to the Top")
Jim Lauderdale, Susan Marshall, Gia Ciambotti, Kristen Mooney – backing vocals ("Jailhouse Tears")
Bruce Fowler – trombone
Walt Fowler – flugelhorn
Albert Wing – tenor saxophone

Charts

References

External links 
 
Lucinda Williams Official Website

Lucinda Williams albums
2008 albums
Lost Highway Records albums